The 1928 Northern Arizona Lumberjacks football team was an American football team that represented Northern Arizona Teachers College at Flagstaff (now known as Northern Arizona University) as an independent during the 1928 college football season. In their second year under head coach Rudy Lavik, the Lumberjacks compiled a 7–1 record, shut out five of eight opponents, and outscored all opponents by a total of 274 to 37.

Schedule

References

Arizona State–Flagstaff
Northern Arizona Lumberjacks football seasons
Arizona State–Flagstaff Lumberjacks football